The Kurzrock–Miller test is an in-vitro test of sperm–mucus interaction. It consists of establishing an interface between cervical mucus and liquefied semen. It is one of the tests used for investigating infertility.

Etymology
The test is named after Raphael Kurzrock and Thomas Grier Miller.

Interpretation
 Negative test: Spermatozoa congregate on semen side of the interface, but do not penetrate it.
 Abnormal: Spermatozoa penetrate the mucus, but rapidly become immobile or acquire shaking movement.
 Poor: after penetration, spermatozoa do not progress farther than 500 μm.
 Normal: Spermatozoa penetrate the mucus and >90% are motile with definite progression, crossing 3 cm at 30 minutes.

See also
Sperm–cervical mucus contact test
Postcoital test
Hamster egg penetration test

References

Fertility medicine
Medical tests